Mieczysław Władysław Gil (9 January 1944 – 29 September 2022) was a Polish trade unionist and politician. A member of the Solidarity Citizens' Committee and later Law and Justice, he served in the Sejm from 1989 to 1993 and the Senate from 2011 to 2015.

Gil died on 29 September 2022, at the age of 78.

References

1944 births
2022 deaths
Polish trade unionists
Members of the Contract Sejm
Members of the Polish Sejm 1991–1993
Members of the Senate of Poland 2011–2015
Polish United Workers' Party members
Law and Justice politicians
Solidarity Electoral Action politicians
People from Staszów County
Recipients of Cross of Freedom and Solidarity